Terry Colin Holdbrooks Jr. was born on July 7, 1983, to Kelly and Terry Holdbrooks. He was raised in Phoenix, Arizona with his biological parents until the age of seven, when they separated. He then went on to live with his grandparents in Scottsdale, Arizona. He went to Saguaro High School, and graduated in 2001, after which he went to the Conservatory of Recording Arts. In August 2002, Terry enlisted in the US Army.

Terry was deployed to Guantánamo Bay detention camp (GTMO) in June 2003 where his work with the detainees led to him accepting Islam just six months into the job. He has written a book entitled Traitor? which discusses his time in GTMO and what he saw and did. He is an advocate of closing GTMO and relinquishing the land back to Cuba.

He left GTMO in 2004 and was discharged from the Army in October 2005 for "personality disorder". Upon returning home, Terry began his further education and gained a degree from Arizona State University in sociology.

On February 28, 2014, Holdbrooks wrote a statement of support for former detainee Moazzam Begg, upon Begg's arrest for suspicion of supporting terrorism, stating that Begg's actions of helping to keep the peace between Guantanamo Bay guards and detainees represented praiseworthy values.

References

1983 births
Living people
Guantanamo Bay detention camp
Military personnel from Phoenix, Arizona
Converts to Islam